"Mr. Ruggerio's Neighborhood" is the 27th episode of the HBO original series The Sopranos and the first of the show's third season. It was written by David Chase and directed by Allen Coulter, and originally aired on March 4, 2001.

Starring
 James Gandolfini as Tony Soprano
 Lorraine Bracco as Dr. Jennifer Melfi *
 Edie Falco as Carmela Soprano
 Michael Imperioli as Christopher Moltisanti
 Dominic Chianese as Corrado Soprano, Jr. *
 Steven Van Zandt as Silvio Dante
 Tony Sirico as Paulie Gualtieri
 Robert Iler as Anthony Soprano, Jr. 
 Jamie-Lynn Sigler as Meadow Soprano
 Drea de Matteo as Adriana La Cerva
 Aida Turturro as Janice Soprano *
 Federico Castelluccio as Furio Giunta

* = credit only

Guest starring
 Jerry Adler as Hesh Rabkin

Also guest starring

Synopsis
FBI agents are conferring about Tony Soprano. They have been listening to his phone calls for years without hearing anything incriminating, and the recordings made by Pussy Bonpensiero also reveal nothing. Using Pussy's file number, CW16, Agent Skip Lipari says that he is "probably compost"; Agent Frank Cubitoso removes Pussy's photograph from the wall and throws it away. Lipari reports that Tony goes to his basement to talk with his associates, believing the conversations will be masked by the noise of the central air conditioning units. They obtain legal authorization to plant a listening device there.

Once a week the house is empty for long enough for the agents to examine the basement and later install the listening device. The first week they enter and find an old reading lamp in which a microphone could be hidden. They take pictures of it so they can replace it with a replica with a hidden listening device. In the second week, their plan is aborted when the house's water heater fails and the basement is flooded. In the third week, they successfully plant the replacement lamp and start listening.

Meadow adjusts to life at Columbia University. Her volatile roommate, Caitlin, is having a hard time.

Tony and the crew eat lunch in the back room of Satriale's. Patsy Parisi is not eating, mourning his identical twin Philly on their birthday. Patsy suspects that Tony had something to do with Philly's death. One afternoon, while the FBI watches Tony's house, they see a drunken Patsy on the pool patio aiming a gun at Tony through the window. Patsy can see Tony clearly in the house, but lowers the gun, turns around, and urinates in the pool. Tony does not see any of this. Some days later, Tony confronts Patsy when they are alone. He tells him that the past is past; he compels and cajoles him into declaring, twice, that he has put his grief behind him.

First appearance
Caitlin Rucker: Meadow's roommate at her college dormitory.

Final appearance
Skip Lipari: FBI handler for Pussy Bonpensiero between 1998–2000.

Title reference
 Mr. Ruggerio is Tony's neighborhood plumber; Agent Harris says the Soprano house is in "Mister Ruggerio's Neighborhood." This is a reference to the children's TV show Mister Rogers' Neighborhood.
 The title is also a reference to Angelo Ruggiero, whose home the FBI planted several bugs in, giving them information about John Gotti and the Gambino crime family.

Production
 The episode was part one of a two-hour season premiere when it originally aired in 2001.
 Federico Castelluccio (Furio Giunta) is now billed in the opening credits as part of the main cast, but only in episodes in which he appears.
 First episode in which Nancy Marchand (Livia Soprano) is not billed in the opening credits.
 This episode features a board of what rank the FBI suspects the mobsters of. In turn, revealing that before his death, Mikey Palmice was promoted to the rank of Consigliere.
FBI Codenames for the Sopranos:
Tony - Papa Bing / Der Bingle
Carmela - Mrs. Bing
Meadow - Princess Bing
A.J. - Baby Bing
The Soprano residence - The Sausage Factory

Music
 The music playing when Tony walks down his driveway in the first scene is the intro to "Sad Eyed Lady of the Lowlife"' by Alabama 3, who also perform the opening theme song. 
 The episode features the "Peter Gunn Theme" (by Henry Mancini) and "Every Breath You Take" (by The Police) mashed up by Kathryn Dayak from HBO. The music is played when the FBI is planting the bug in Tony's house.
 While driving, Tony sings along with Steely Dan's "Dirty Work".
 In the dormitory, when Caitlyn is telling Meadow about the man on the train, "Van Gogh" by Ras Kass is being played in the hallway.
 When Anthony is being picked up for school by his friends, the song heard playing in the car is "Scud Missile" by Ganjah K.
 Tony listens to "Hotel California" by Eagles while exercising at the end of the episode.
 Elvis Costello's "High Fidelity" plays at the very end of the episode, as Tony and Carmela converse in front of the bugged lamp.

Filming locations 
Listed in order of first appearance:

 North Caldwell, New Jersey
 Albertus Magnus High School in Bardonia, New York
 Bronx Community College
 Satriale's Pork Store in Kearny, New Jersey
 Glen Ridge, New Jersey
 New City, New York
 Verona Park in Verona, New Jersey
 Bada Bing in Lodi, New Jersey

References

External links
"Mr. Ruggerio's Neighborhood" at HBO

The Sopranos (season 3) episodes
2001 American television episodes
Television episodes directed by Allen Coulter
Television episodes written by David Chase